PBDS or PBDs or Pbds may refer to:

Organizations
 Parti Bansa Dayak Sarawak, a Malaysian defunct political party formed in 1983 and dissolved in 2004.
 Parti Bansa Dayak Sarawak Baru, a Malaysian political party formed in 2013.

Other uses
 PrimeBase PrimeBase SQL Data Server, a SQL database server developed and maintained by PrimeBase Systems GmbH of Germany. 
 Peroxisome biogenesis disorders, autosomal recessive developmental brain disorders that caused by defects in peroxisome functions also result in skeletal and craniofacial dysmorphism, liver dysfunction, progressive sensorineural hearing loss and retinopathy.